The Sea is the fifth studio album by English singer Melanie C. Made under her own independent record label Red Girl Records, the album marked her first new material in four years, since the reunion with the Spice Girls.

Preceding the album's release, promotional single, and lead single on the German version, "Rock Me" was released for digital download worldwide (and as well as a physical single in Germany, Austria and Switzerland) on 24 June 2011. The single serves as the official song of the popular German TV network ZDF's media coverage of the 2011 FIFA Women's World Cup. The music video for lead single "Think About It", premiered on 15 July 2011 on her official website and was simultaneously sent to radio stations in the UK.

Recording and production
The album was recorded in London. Chisholm talked about her inspirations and goals for this record:

"I'm very excited about the record because, it's quite diverse in styles. I've worked with lots of new writers, people I haven't worked with before. There's still very much a pop element, and I've got some lovely ballads, some rock inspired tracks, some more dancey stuff, some acoustic stuff, and production wise there are some very atmospheric moments. So I really think it's going to be a diverse and stronger album. When I started working with this album, I really didn't know what I wanted to achieve, so I wanted to be ambitious and experiment, work with new people, and try on different styles of music. And through doing that I really discovered the way I wanted to express myself and the sound I wanted to create. All that has made it become quite diverse, and it's funny because I suppose my first studio album Northern Star is probably the most similar to this record in that it does have loads of different styles although it is fundamentally a pop record."

Concept and artwork
Regarding the concept of The Sea, Chisholm said in a video interview on YouTube that, the album is cohesively experimental mixing many different genres/styles of music into one unified pop album with electronic undertones, therefore naming it The Sea, which ecomphases the many species who inhabit beneath the oceans surface. Mel has also described the album as being both harmonic and euphoric in feeling. The cover, which depicts Chisholm standing and emerging from the sea, was photographed on location in Whitby, North Yorkshire.

Cover photography is by Pip who also provides a couple of the inner location photographs. Additional booklet photography is by long-term collaborator Ray Burmiston. The sleeve is by Ian Ross who also designed Chisholm's two previous solo albums, Beautiful Intentions and This Time.

Composition
Chisholm stated that she worked with a lot of new writers and producers for this album, where she tended to work with the same writers for her previous records, notably Adam Argyle, who co-wrote some material for this record. The album was co-written /produced with the likes of Starsailor's James Walsh, Guy Chambers, and Spice/Spiceworld producer Richard Stannard, Andy Chatterley (both of whom have worked with artists such as Kylie Minogue, amongst others). Chisholm also worked with the Swedish Cutfather producing team. The album has acoustic moments, as well as some rock-driven songs and upbeat dance records.

Singles
 "Rock Me" was released only in Germany on 24 June 2011. The song serves as the official song of the popular German channel ZDF's coverage of the 2011 FIFA Women's World Cup. The music video for "Rock Me" premiered on Chrisholm's YouTube channel on 7 June 2011. The single reached the Top 40 on the German Singles Chart and was featured in the UK as a B-side on the "Think About It" CD single.
 The lead worldwide single, "Think About It" premiered in the form of a music video premiere held on MelanieC.net on 15 July 2011. The single was released on 4 September 2011 and charted within the Top 100 of the UK Singles Chart at number 95. The track also went Top 10 on the Canadian Physical Singles chart (number 6) and Top 40 in both Austria (number 34) and Switzerland (number 30; also number 16 in the Swiss Radio Airplay Chart) and in Poland number 35 on radio airplay chart. The single peaked at number 15 on the Official UK Indie singles charts.
 In the UK, "Weak" was released as the album's official second single and was released on 6 November 2011. The song peaked at number 29 on the UK Indie Singles Chart and at number 50 on UK Radio Airplay Chart, her highest appearance on the chart since her 2003 single "Melt".
"Let There Be Love" was released in Germany, Switzerland, and Austria on 2 December 2011.

Critical reception

The album received positive reviews from music critics. Jon O'Brien wrote positively for AllMusic that "The Sea is still a huge leap forward from her past three efforts, and had it been released as the follow-up to Northern Star, rather than 12 years down the line, it could possibly have sustained her initial solo success." O'Brien, who rated it three-and-a-half out of five stars, went to praise the tracks "Think About It" and "Stupid Game", which he considered "bombastic Katy Perry/Kelly Clarkson-esque pop/rock anthems which prove she can still compete with those who were barely in their teens during the peak of Spicemania, while the grandiose "Get Out of Here" sounds like Muse's cover of "Feeling Good" crossed with a John Barry's James Bond score."

Pip Elwood from the "Entertainment Focus" was also positive, rating it four out of five stars. He wrote that "The Sea is a strong release from Melanie and one that could return her to her former chart glory. (...) "The Sea is a consistent collection of pop gems that should score her another big hit." Simon Gage wrote favorably for the Daily Express that "This new album, her first in four years, gives that voice a real workout from power ballads and rock-outs to dancefloor fillers." OK! Magazine wrote that "The Sea is easily her most ambitious album yet, blending rock, pop and maybe the tiniest hint of electro." Jade Wright from Liverpool Echo wrote a favorable review, stating that "Mel C proves it’s about being real – there’s no saccharine sweetness, no femme fatale, just a take-me-as-you-see me attitude that shines through. The Sea makes for a good listen, whether you’re a fan or not." Nick Harries from Sunday Mercury wrote a very positive review, declaring that the singer "cue a set with something for everyone – dance pop (Think About It); Alanis angst (Beautiful Mind); songwriter chic (One By One); 1980s electrobeat (Stupid Game); radio rock (All About You) – and the ballistic big finish (all eight minutes of Enemy). Best is the title track opener, with its minor key melody and drumbeat drama."

Track listing

B-sides

Leftover tracks
 "Too Soon" - 3:12
 Released on The Sea – Live DVD
 "Rising Sun" - 3:44
 Released on Melanie C's official YouTube channel

Charts

Release history

References

Melanie C albums
Albums produced by Cutfather
2011 albums